Nakitai Nara (If I Want to Cry) is the twenty-seventh single released by J-Pop singer Hitomi Shimatani. It peaked at #34 on the Oricon charts and sold around 3,754 copies. To date, it is currently her lowest-selling single.

Track listing 
 Nakitai Nara (泣きたいなら, If I Want to Cry) (4:20)
 Kuchizuke Shiyou (口づけしよう, Let's Kiss) (3:41)
 Nakitai Nara (泣きたいなら, If I Want to Cry) (instrumental) (4:20)
 Kuchizuke Shiyou (口づけしよう, Let's Kiss) (instrumental) (3:41)

DVD track list 
 Nakitai Nara (full drama version) (泣きたいなら)
 Shimatani Hitomi interview

References

2008 singles
Hitomi Shimatani songs
2008 songs
Avex Trax singles
Song articles with missing songwriters